Isaac Ganón (30 August 1916 – 10 September 1975) was a Uruguayan sociologist.

He is considered a founder of sociological lecturing and investigation in Uruguay. He chaired the Uruguayan Association of Social Sciences and also the Latin American Sociological Association. From 1958 till 1968 he led the Institute of Sociology at the University of the Republic.

References

1916 births
1975 deaths
People from Concordia, Entre Ríos
Uruguayan sociologists